The Department for Constitutional Affairs (DCA) was a United Kingdom government department. Its creation was announced on 12 June 2003; it took over the functions of  the Lord Chancellor's Department. On 28 March 2007 it was announced that the Department for Constitutional Affairs would take control of probation, prisons and prevention of re-offending from the Home Office and be renamed the Ministry of Justice. This took place on 9 May 2007.

It was primarily responsible for reforms to the constitution, relations with the Channel Islands and Isle of Man and, within England and Wales, it was concerned with the administration of the Courts, legal aid, and the appointment of the judiciary. Other responsibilities included issues relating to human rights, data protection, and freedom of information.

It incorporated the Wales Office and the Scotland Office, but those offices remained the overall responsibility of the Secretary of State for Wales and Secretary of State for Scotland respectively.

After the 2005 general election, it gained additional responsibilities for coroners and conduct of local government elections in England.

Departmental executive agencies and public bodies
His Majesty's Courts Service (for England and Wales)
Public Guardianship Office (for England and Wales)
Tribunals Service
Official Solicitor and Public Trustee
Legal Services Commission
HM Land Registry

Legislation enacted by the department

This is a list of Acts of Parliament enacted since 1997 that gave powers to the Department of Constitutional Affairs.

Constitutional acts

Compensation Act 2006
Criminal Defence Service Act 2006
Inquiries Act 2005
Constitutional Reform Act 2005
Mental Capacity Act 2005
Gender Recognition Act 2004
Courts Act 2003
Commonhold and Leasehold Reform Act 2002
Land Registration Act 2002
Freedom of Information Act 2000
Access to Justice Act 1999
Data Protection Act 1998
Human Rights Act 1998

Election acts
Electoral Administration Act 2006
European Parliamentary and Local Elections (Pilots) Act 2004
European Parliament (Representation) Act 2003
European Parliamentary Elections Act 2002
Political Parties, Elections and Referendums Act 2000
Representation of the People Act 2000

See also

English law
Scottish Government
Courts of Scotland
Departments of the United Kingdom Government

References

External links
Department for Constitutional Affairs Official Archived Website from 6 May 2007
His Majesty's Courts Service
Land Registry
The National Archives
Public Guardianship Office
Tribunals Service

Constitutional Affairs
2003 establishments in the United Kingdom
Constitution of the United Kingdom
2007 disestablishments in the United Kingdom

no:Departementet for konstitusjonelle saker